The following lists events in the year 2020 in Hungary.

Incumbents
President: János Áder
Prime Minister: Viktor Orbán
Speaker of the National Assembly: László Kövér

Events

January 

12 – 25 January – The 2020 Women's European Water Polo Championship is held in Budapest.
14 – 26 January – The 2020 Men's European Water Polo Championship is held in Budapest.
24 – 26 January – The 2020 European Short Track Speed Skating Championships is scheduled to be held in Debrecen.

February
 8 February – LMP – Hungary's Green Party changes its name from "Politics Can Be Different", and its abrriviation form "LMP" to "Greens".

March
 4 March – The first two COVID-19 cases are reported in Hungary.
 11 March - COVID-19 cases reached 13. Hungarian Government declared a medical emergency in Hungary, with several restriction to the general public, due to the rising COVID-19 cases.
 30 March – the Hungarian parliament voted in favor of passing legislation that would create a state of emergency without a time limit, grant Prime Minister Viktor Orbán the ability to rule by decree, the suspension of parliament with no elections, and prison sentences for spreading fake news and leaving quarantine.

May
 19 May – Hungary outlaws changing birth gender on documents.
 11 – 24 May – The 2020 European Aquatics Championships is scheduled to be held in Budapest.
 21 May – Two people are stabbed to death at Deák Ferenc Square, Budapest. Due to the victim's allegiance to Újpest FC, and the alleged Romani identity of the attacker, the murder sparks protests. The protests are organised by football ultras and the far-right Our Homeland Movement.

November
 29 November – Hungarian MEP József Szájer resigns his position after having been caught by Belgian police at a gay sex party on the night of 27 November, in violation of local COVID-19 regulations.
 30 November  – Viktor Orbán surpasses Kálmán Tisza as the longest-serving Prime Minister of Hungary after 14 years and 145 days in office. (Index.hu)

December
 15 December – The Hungarian parliament passes a law that effectively bans adoptions by same-sex couples. According to the measure, only married couples can adopt children while single people must obtain special approval to adopt from the family affairs minister, Lawmakers also amended the Hungarian constitution, with a new definition for family as the union of a father who is a man and a mother who is a woman.

Deaths

January 

1 January – János Aczél, Hungarian-Canadian mathematician (b. 1924).
4 January – Károly Gesztesi, actor (b. 1963).
12 January – Miklós Vető, Hungarian-born French philosopher (b. 1936).
16 January – László Iván, psychiatrist and politician (b. 1933).

February 

1 February – Péter Andorai, actor (b. 1948).
12 February – Tamás Wichmann, sprint canoeist (b. 1948).
24 February – István Csukás, writer and poet (b. 1936).
29 February – Éva Székely, swimmer (b. 1927).

March 

1 March – István Balsai, politician and jurist (b. 1947).

June 

9 June – Ödön Földessy, long jumper (b. 1929)
27 June – Olga Tass, Olympic gymnast (b. 1929)

See also
Hungary at the 2020 Summer Olympics
List of Hungarian films since 1990

References

 
2020s in Hungary
Years of the 21st century in Hungary
Hungary
Hungary